Sør-Herøy (South Herøy) is an island in the middle of the municipality of Herøy in Nordland county, Norway. Sør-Herøy is surrounded by the following islands: Nord-Herøy (to the northeast), Tenna (to the south), and Indre Øksningan (to the northwest). To the west lies Færøysundet (Færøya Strait), named after the islet of Færøya, which is actually a peninsula connected to Sør-Herøy. To the east lies Herøysundet (Herøy Strait), which is crossed by the Herøysund Bridge and Norwegian County Road 828 to Nord-Herøy. To the south lies Tennsundet (Tenna Strait) with the Tennsund Bridge and Norwegian County Road 161 to Tenna. The bridges create part of the road network connecting the municipality of Herøy to the island of Dønna, which lies to the north in the municipality of Dønna.  The island has a population of 446 (in 2017).

Sør-Herøy is the location of Herøy Church, an old stone church dating from the 1100s, where the poet and priest Petter Dass served as a curate. The parsonage is also located on the island.

Herøy School serves students from Sør-Herøy, Tenna, and Nord-Herøy, which were combined into a single school district in 2008.

There is a ferry stop located on the southeastern shore of the island with regular ferries to the nearby islands of Alsten, Altra, and Husvær.

See also
List of islands of Norway

References

Islands of Nordland
Herøy, Nordland